Ruth Noemí Colón (born November 21, 1958) was the 66th Secretary of State of New York, serving in the Cabinets of Governors David Paterson and Andrew Cuomo.  She was appointed by Governor Paterson to replace outgoing Secretary Lorraine Cortés-Vázquez who officially resigned on September 1, 2010.

A resident of White Plains, Secretary Colón is a member of the Westchester Women's Bar Association and serves on the board of directors of the Puerto Rican Bar Association.

On March 31, 2011, Governor Andrew Cuomo announced the nomination of Cesar A. Perales for the Secretary of State position. Effectively since May 2, 2011, Perales replaced Colón as the state's new Secretary of State and was confirmed by the New York State Senate on June 7.

Further reading
Paterson, David “Black, Blind, & In Charge: A Story of Visionary Leadership and Overcoming Adversity.” New York, New York, 2020

See also

List of Puerto Ricans

References

American politicians of Puerto Rican descent
Puerto Rican people in New York (state) politics
People from Caguas, Puerto Rico
David Paterson
Hispanic and Latino American women in politics
Living people
New York (state) Democrats
New York (state) lawyers
Pace University School of Law alumni
Secretaries of State of New York (state)
University of Puerto Rico alumni
Politicians from Westchester County, New York
Women in New York (state) politics
1958 births